The 2019 County Championship, known for sponsorship reasons as the 2019 Specsavers County Championship, was the 120th cricket County Championship season. As in 2018, Division One had eight teams and Division Two had ten teams. The first round of matches began on 5 April and the final round of matches ended on 26 September. Surrey were the defending champions. At the end of the 2019 season only one team was relegated with three promoted. Therefore, from 2020 onwards, Division One would feature ten teams and Division Two would feature eight.

Teams 
Source:

Division One 
 Team promoted from Division Two in 2018

Division Two 
 Team relegated from Division One in 2018

Results
Fixtures for the 2019 County Championship were announced on 26 November 2018, with the previous season's champions Surrey beginning the defence of their title against Essex at The Oval.

Division One

April

May

June

July

August

September

Division Two

April

May

June

July

August

September

Standings 
Teams receive 16 points for a win, 8 for a tie and 5 for a draw. Bonus points (a maximum of 5 batting points and 3 bowling points) may be scored during the first 110 overs of each team's first innings.

Division One

Division Two

Statistics

Division One 

 Highest score by a team: Kent − 585/7d (144.1 overs) vs Warwickshire (June 30−3 July)
 Lowest score by a team (completed innings): Kent − 40 all out (18.1 overs) vs Essex (18−20 August)
 Top score by an individual: Dom Sibley (Warwickshire) − 244 (491) vs Kent (Jun 30−3 July)
 Best bowling figures by an individual: Kyle Abbott (Hampshire) − 9/40 (18.4 overs) vs Somerset (16−19 September)

Most runs

Source: ESPNcricinfo

Most wickets 

Source: ESPNcricinfo

Division Two 

 Highest score by a team: Northamptonshire − 750 all out (227.3 overs) vs Glamorgan (11−14 April)
 Lowest score by a team (completed innings): Middlesex − 75 all out (21.4 overs) vs Sussex (18-20 August)
 Top score by an individual: Dane Vilas (Lancashire) − 266 (240) vs Glamorgan (18-20 August)
 Best bowling figures by an individual: Ollie Robinson (Sussex) − 8/34 (11 overs) vs Middlesex (18-20 August)

Most runs

Source: ESPNcricinfo

Most wickets 

Source: ESPNcricinfo

References

2019
County Championship